Noelle Kocot (born 1970) is an American poet. They are the author of nine full-length collections of poetry, including' "Ascent of the Mothers" (forthcoming, Wave Books),'God's Green Earth (Wave Books, 2020), Phantom Pains of Madness (Wave Books, 2016), Soul in Space (Wave Books, 2013), The Bigger World (Wave Books, 2011) Sunny Wednesday (Wave Books, 2009), "Poem for the End of Time and Other Poems" (Wave Books, 2006), The Raving Fortune (Four Way Books, 2004) and 4 (Four Way Books, 2001)

 Career 
Kocot teaches part time at The New School in the creative writing program, and has also taught at the New Writers Project in Austin, Texas. They are a graduate of Oberlin College.

 Personal life 
Kocot was born and raised in Brooklyn, New York, and now resides in New Jersey, where they are the poet laureate of Pemberton Borough. 

Kocot was hospitalized in 2000 at Bellevue Hospital, where they were diagnosed with bipolar disorder.

They were married to the composer Damon Tomblin, whose death of a drug overdose in 2004 inspired their collection Sunny Wednesday. Writing and awards The New York Times, reviewing their 2006 book Poem for the End of Time and Other Poems, noted that "these poems are saturated with despair, but cling to a grim, even masochistic hopefulness," and called the title poem."extraordinary"  They have also published Poet By Default (Wave Books, 2011), a limited-edition collection of translations of the poems of Tristan Corbière. Kocot has received numerous honors for their poetry, including a NEA fellowship, A Fund for Poetry grant (2001), the S.J. Marks Memorial Award from The American Poetry Review, the Greenwall Prize from the Academy of American Poets (2001) a Lannan Fellowship (2014). Their work has been included in many anthologies, such as The Best American Poetry anthologies for 2001, 2012 and 2013 and the 2013 edition of Postmodern American Poetry: A Norton Anthology. Reviewing their 2007 collection in Jacket Magazine, critic Craig Johnson noted their "broad brushstrokes and a large intoxicated surrealistic vision." Matthew Paul, reviewing their 2018 chapbook, stressed the visual aspects of their surrealistic approach to writing: they "can cast an intriguingly surreal spell through compelling imagery.  Their work has been written about in several books, including, Suddenness and the Composition of Poetic Thought by Paul Magee (Rowman and Littlefield; London and New York, 2022).

Bibliography
 "Ascent of the Mothers" (forthcoming, Wave Books)
"Under Gemini" (Five Hundred Places Press, 2020), chapbook, 2 volumes (Berlin)God's Green Earth (Wave Books, 2020)Humanity (SurVision Books, 2018) - chapbook, 34 pages (Ireland)Sonnets- (Clinic Publishing, 2017) - chapbook, 28 pages (UK)Phantom Pains of Madness (Wave Books, May 2016)Soul in Space (Wave Books, October 2013)Poet By Default (translations of Tristan Corbière)  (Wave Books, 2011)The Bigger World (Wave Books, 2011)Damon's Room (a bibliographic pamphlet) (Wave Books, 2010)Sunny Wednesday (Wave Books, 2009)Poem for the End of Time and Other Poems (Wave Books, 2006)The Raving Fortune (Four Way Books, 2004)4'' (Four Way Books, 2001)

Reviews
 EcoTheo Review https://www.ecotheo.org/grace-and-ongoingness-noelle-kocots-path-among-the-forms/— 
 The White Review  https://www.thewhitereview.org/reviews/noelle-kocots-gods-green-earth/
 https://www.poetryfoundation.org/articles/153642/after-the-hard-living—Justin Taylor's article with The Poetry Foundation
 https://www.publishersweekly.com/9781950268023 Starred review in Publishers Weekly of God's Green Earth
 Review of The Bigger World in The Rumpus
 Review of The Bigger World at Coldfront
 Publishers Weekly reviews Sunny Wednesday
 The New York Times reviews Poem for the End of Time

References

External links
Noelle Kocot at Wave Books
Noelle Kocot at the Poetry Foundation

21st-century American poets
People from New Jersey
Living people
National Endowment for the Arts Fellows
Writers from New Jersey
American women poets
21st-century American women writers
1970 births